A magnetic proximity fuse was  patented by P.J. Eliomarkakis, (United States Patent US2434551 of January 13, 1948)  although similar devices had been in service for nearly a decade.  It is a type of proximity fuze that initiates a detonator in a piece of ordnance such as a land mine, naval mine, depth charge, or shell when the fuse's magnetic equilibrium is upset by a magnetic object such as a tank or a submarine. 

Magnetic field sensors and movement sensors inside the ordnance detect changes to the terrestrial magnetic field of the ordnance caused by another ferromagnetic object. A signal processor inside the ordnance receives the signals from the magnetic field sensors and movement sensors and activates the detonator which will then detonate the explosives within the ordnance.

Examples
Examples of pieces of ordnance that employ a magnetic fuze include: 
 the Chinese Chen-2 bottom mine
 the Egyptian T-93 mine

See also
 Proximity sensor
 Reed switch
 Precision bombing
 Precision-guided munition
 Guided bomb
 Guidance system
 Terminal guidance
 Artillery fuze
 Missile
 Proximity fuze

References

Fuzes
Switches
Electromagnetic components